General Juan Pereda Asbún assumed the presidency of Bolivia on 21 July 1978, and on 24 July 1978 formed his cabinet. He was removed from office on 3 November later that year.

MNR – Revolutionary Nationalist Movement

FSB – Bolivian Socialist Falange

PIR – Revolutionary Left Party

UNB – Barrientista National Union

ARB – Barrientista Revolutionary Alliance

BRB – Barrientista Revolutionary Block

mil – military

ind – independent

Notes

Cabinets of Bolivia
Cabinets established in 1978
Cabinets disestablished in 1978
1978 establishments in Bolivia